TuS Erndtebrück is a German association football club from the town of Erndtebrück, Siegen-Wittgenstein. The club was established in 1895 as the gymnastics club Turnverein Erndtebrück. Today, TuS has a dozen other sports departments in addition to its football side.

History
TuS was originally established with departments for gymnastics and athletics and grew in 1897 to include a newly formed marching band. After merging with VfB Erndtebrück in 1921, the club was renamed Turn- und Sportverein Erndtebrück and formed a football department at that time. In 1953, swimming and winter sports departments were formed, with the skiers becoming quite successful. Other sports were added over the years, including bowling (1963), martial arts (1988), Taekwondo (1992), and jiu-jitsu (2003).

The footballers first came to note with their promotion to the Verbandsliga Westfalen (VI) in 2000. They narrowly missed advancing to the Landesliga when they lost a playoff match to SV Hohenlimburg in a shootout. They finished third in 2007–08 and as runners-up behind SpVgg Erkenschwick in 2009–10 before finally capturing the league title in 2011 to advance to the NRW-Liga (V). That same season, the second team side captured the Bezirksliga title to advance to Landesliga play, and beat Sportfreunde Siegen to win the Kreispokal. Since 2012 the club played in the tier five Oberliga Westfalen, where it won a league championship in 2015 and earned promotion to the Regionalliga West for a season before being relegated again.

Current squad

Honours
 Westfalenliga – Group 2
 Champions: 2011
 Oberliga Westfalen
 Champions: 2014–15, 2016–17

References

External links
Official team site
fussballdaten.de

Football clubs in Germany
1895 establishments in Germany
Association football clubs established in 1921
Football clubs in North Rhine-Westphalia
Sports clubs established in 1895